Ancita is a genus of longhorn beetles of the subfamily Lamiinae, containing the following species:

 Ancita albescens Breuning, 1938
 Ancita anisocera Pascoe, 1875
 Ancita anisoceroides Breuning, 1978
 Ancita antennata (Pascoe, 1865)
 Ancita australica (Breuning, 1982)
 Ancita australis (Boisduval, 1835)
 Ancita basalis (Pascoe, 1867)
 Ancita basicristata Breuning, 1970
 Ancita cristata (Pascoe, 1875)
 Ancita crocogaster (Boisduval, 1835)
 Ancita didyma Blackburn, 1901
 Ancita fasciculata (Blackburn, 1893)
 Ancita fuscicornis (Germar, 1848)
 Ancita germari (Pascoe, 1865)
 Ancita lineola (Newman, 1851)
 Ancita longicornis McKeown, 1948
 Ancita major Breuning, 1968
 Ancita marginicollis (Boisduval, 1835)
 Ancita niphonoides (Pascoe, 1863)
 Ancita ochraceovittata Breuning, 1936
 Ancita paranisocera Breuning, 1970  
 Ancita parantennata Breuning, 1970
 Ancita paravaricornis Breuning, 1968
 Ancita penicillata Aurivillius, 1917
 Ancita setosa Breuning, 1940
 Ancita similis Breuning, 1938
 Ancita varicornis (Germar, 1848)

References

 
Desmiphorini
Cerambycidae genera